is a 2015 Japanese suspense action drama film directed by  and based on the Japanese television drama series  (S: The Last Policeman).

Cast
Osamu Mukai
Gō Ayano
Yui Aragaki
Kazue Fukiishi
Munetaka Aoki
Hiroyuki Ikeuchi
Hiroyuki Hirayama

Yasukaze Motomiya

Reception
The film grossed  on its opening weekend.

References

External links
 

2010s Japanese films
Japanese action drama films
2015 action drama films
Films about terrorism
Films based on television series

ja:S -最後の警官-#.E6.98.A0.E7.94.BB